Takata Station (高田駅) is the name of multiple train stations in Japan:

 Takata Station (Fukuoka)
 Takata Station (Kagawa)
 Takata Station (Kanagawa)

See also 
 高田駅 (disambiguation)
 Kōda Station (disambiguation)
 Takada Station (disambiguation)